The Bangladesh Liberation War (also known as the Bangladesh War of Independence, or simply the Liberation War in Bangladesh) was a revolution and armed conflict sparked by the rise of the Bengali nationalist and self-determination movement in East Pakistan, which resulted in the independence of Bangladesh. The war began when the Pakistani military junta based in West Pakistan—under the orders of Yahya Khan—launched Operation Searchlight against the people of East Pakistan on the night of 25 March 1971, initiating the Bangladesh genocide.

In response to the violence, members of the Mukti Bahini—a guerrilla resistance movement formed by Bengali military, paramilitary and civilians—launched a mass guerrilla war against the Pakistani military, liberating numerous towns and cities in the initial months of the conflict. At first, the Pakistan Army regained momentum during the monsoon, but Bengali guerrillas counterattacked by carrying out widespread sabotage, including through Operation Jackpot against the Pakistan Navy, while the nascent Bangladesh Air Force flew sorties against Pakistani military bases. India joined the war on 3 December 1971, after which Pakistan launched preemptive air strikes on northern India. The subsequent Indo-Pakistani War witnessed engagements on two warfronts; with air supremacy achieved in the eastern theatre, and the rapid advance of the Allied Forces of Mukti Bahini and the Indian military, Pakistan surrendered in Dhaka on 16 December 1971, in what remains to date the largest surrender of armed personnel since the Second World War.

Rural and urban areas across East Pakistan saw extensive military operations and air strikes to suppress the tide of civil disobedience that formed following the 1970 election stalemate. The Pakistan Army, which had the backing of Islamists, created radical religious militias—the Razakars, Al-Badr and Al-Shams—to assist it during raids on the local populace. Members of the Pakistani military and supporting militias engaged in mass murder, deportation and genocidal rape, pursuing a systematic campaign of annihilation against nationalist Bengali civilians, students, intelligentsia, religious minorities and armed personnel. The capital, Dhaka, was the scene of numerous massacres, including the Dhaka University massacre. Sectarian violence also broke out between Bengalis and Urdu-speaking Biharis. An estimated 10 million Bengali refugees fled to neighbouring India, while 30 million were internally displaced. 

The war changed the geopolitical landscape of South Asia, with the emergence of Bangladesh as the seventh-most populous country in the world. Due to complex regional alliances, the war was a major episode in Cold War tensions involving the United States, the Soviet Union and the People's Republic of China. The majority of member states in the United Nations recognised Bangladesh as a sovereign nation in 1972.

Background 

Before the Partition of British India, the Lahore Resolution initially envisaged separate Muslim-majority states in the eastern and northwestern zones of British India. A proposal for an independent United Bengal was mooted by Prime Minister Huseyn Shaheed Suhrawardy in 1946, but was opposed by the colonial authorities. The East Pakistan Renaissance Society advocated the creation of a sovereign state in eastern British India.

Political negotiations led, in August 1947, to the official birth of two states, Pakistan and India, giving presumably permanent homes for Muslims and Hindus respectively following the departure of the British. The Dominion of Pakistan comprised two geographically and culturally separate areas to the east and the west with India in between.

The western zone was popularly (and for a period, also officially) termed West Pakistan and the eastern zone (modern-day Bangladesh) was initially termed East Bengal and later, East Pakistan. Although the population of the two zones was close to equal, political power was concentrated in West Pakistan and it was widely perceived that East Pakistan was being exploited economically, leading to many grievances. Administration of two discontinuous territories was also seen as a challenge.

On 25 March 1971, after an election won by an East Pakistani political party (the Awami League) was ignored by the ruling (West Pakistani) establishment, rising political discontent and cultural nationalism in East Pakistan was met by brutal and suppressive force from the ruling elite of the West Pakistan establishment, in what came to be termed as Operation Searchlight. The violent crackdown by the Pakistan Army led to Awami League leader Sheikh Mujibur Rahman declaring East Pakistan's independence as the state of Bangladesh on 26 March 1971. Most Bengalis supported this move although Islamists and Biharis opposed this and sided with the Pakistan Army instead.

Pakistani President Agha Muhammad Yahya Khan ordered the Pakistani military to restore the Pakistani government's authority, beginning the civil war. The war led to a substantial number of refugees (estimated at the time to be about 10 million) flooding into the eastern provinces of India. Facing a mounting humanitarian and economic crisis, India started actively aiding and organising the Bangladeshi resistance army known as the Mukti Bahini.

Language controversy 

In 1948, Governor-General Muhammad Ali Jinnah declared that "Urdu, and only Urdu" would be the federal language of Pakistan. However, Urdu was historically prevalent only in the north, central, and western region of the subcontinent; whereas in East Bengal, the native language was Bengali, one of the two most easterly branches of the Indo-European languages. The Bengali-speaking people of Pakistan constituted over 56% of the country's population.

The government stand was widely viewed as an attempt to suppress the culture of the eastern wing. The people of East Bengal demanded that their language be given federal status alongside Urdu and English. The Language Movement began in 1948, as civil society protested the removal of the Bengali script from currency and stamps, which were in place since the British Raj.

The movement reached its climax in 1952, when on 21 February, the police fired on protesting students and civilians, causing several deaths. The day is revered in Bangladesh as the Language Movement Day. Later, in memory of the deaths in 1952, UNESCO declared 21 February as International Mother Language Day in November 1999.

Disparities 
Although East Pakistan had a larger population, West Pakistan dominated the divided country politically and received more money from the common budget.

East Pakistan was already economically disadvantaged at the time of Pakistan's creation yet this economic disparity only increased under Pakistani rule. Factors included not only the deliberate state discrimination in developmental policies but also the fact that the presence of the country's capital and more immigrant businessmen in the Western wing directed greater government allocations there. Due to low numbers of native businessmen in East Pakistan, substantial labour unrest and a tense political environment, there were also much lower foreign investments in the eastern wing. The Pakistani state's economic outlook was geared towards urban industry, which was not compatible with East Pakistan's mainly agrarian economy.

Bengalis were under-represented in the Pakistan military. Officers of Bengali origin in the different wings of the armed forces made up just 5% of overall force by 1965; of these, only a few were in command positions, with the majority in technical or administrative posts. West Pakistanis believed that Bengalis were not "martially inclined" unlike Pashtuns and Punjabis; the "martial races" notion was dismissed as ridiculous and humiliating by Bengalis.

Moreover, despite huge defence spending, East Pakistan received none of the benefits, such as contracts, purchasing and military support jobs. The Indo-Pakistani War of 1965 over Kashmir also highlighted the sense of military insecurity among Bengalis, as only an under-strength infantry division and 15 combat aircraft without tank support were in East Pakistan to thwart any Indian retaliations during the conflict.

Ideological and cultural differences 

In 1947 the Bengali Muslims had identified themselves with Pakistan's Islamic project but by the 1970s the people of East Pakistan had given priority to their Bengali ethnicity over their religious identity, desiring a society in accordance with Western principles such as secularism, democracy and socialism. Many Bengali Muslims strongly objected to the Islamist paradigm imposed by the Pakistani state.

Most members of West Pakistan's ruling elite shared a vision of a liberal society, but nevertheless viewed a common faith as an essential mobilising factor behind Pakistan's creation and the subsuming of Pakistan's multiple regional identities into one national identity. West Pakistanis were substantially more supportive than East Pakistanis of an Islamic state, a tendency that persisted after 1971.

Cultural and linguistic differences between the two wings gradually outweighed any sense of religious unity. The Bengalis took great pride in their culture and language which, with its Bengali script and vocabulary, was unacceptable to the West Pakistani elite, who believed that it had assimilated considerable Hindu cultural influences. West Pakistanis, in an attempt to "Islamise" the East, wanted the Bengalis to adopt Urdu. The activities of the language movement nurtured a sentiment among Bengalis in favour of discarding Pakistan's communalism in favour of secular politics. The Awami League began propagating its secular message through its newspaper to the Bengali readership.

The Awami League's emphasis on secularism differentiated it from the Muslim League. In 1971, the Bangladeshi liberation struggle against Pakistan was led by secular leaders and secularists hailed the Bangladeshi victory as the triumph of secular Bengali nationalism over religion-centred Pakistani nationalism. While Pakistan's government strives for an Islamic state, Bangladesh was established secular. After the liberation victory, the Awami League attempted to build a secular order and the pro-Pakistan Islamist parties were barred from political participation. The majority of East Pakistani ulama had either remained neutral or supported the Pakistani state, since they felt that the break-up of Pakistan would be detrimental for Islam.

Political differences 

Although East Pakistan accounted for a slight majority of the country's population, political power remained in the hands of West Pakistanis. Since a straightforward system of representation based on population would have concentrated political power in East Pakistan, the West Pakistani establishment came up with the "One Unit" scheme, where all of West Pakistan was considered one province. This was solely to counterbalance the East wing's votes.

After the assassination of Liaquat Ali Khan, Pakistan's first prime minister, in 1951, political power began to devolve to the new President of Pakistan, which replaced the office of Governor General when Pakistan became a republic, and, eventually, the military. The nominal elected chief executive, the Prime Minister, was frequently sacked by the establishment, acting through the President.

The East Pakistanis observed that the West Pakistani establishment would swiftly depose any East Pakistanis elected leader of Pakistan, such as Khawaja Nazimuddin, Mohammad Ali Bogra, Huseyn Shaheed Suhrawardy or Iskander Mirza. Their suspicions were further aggravated by the military dictatorships of Ayub Khan (27 October 1958 – 25 March 1969) and Yahya Khan (25 March 1969 – 20 December 1971), both West Pakistanis. The situation reached a climax in 1970, when the Bangladesh Awami League, the largest East Pakistani political party, led by Sheikh Mujibur Rahman, won a landslide victory in the national elections. The party won 167 of the 169 seats allotted to East Pakistan, and thus a majority of the 313 seats in the National Assembly. This gave the Awami League the constitutional right to form a government. However, Zulfikar Ali Bhutto (a former Foreign Minister), the leader of the Pakistan People's Party, refused to allow Rahman to become the Prime Minister of Pakistan.

Instead, he proposed the idea of having two Prime Ministers, one for each wing. The proposal elicited outrage in the east wing, already chafing under the other constitutional innovation, the "One Unit scheme". Bhutto also refused to accept Rahman's Six Points. On 3 March 1971, the two leaders of the two wings along with the President General Yahya Khan met in Dacca to decide the fate of the country.

After their discussions yielded no satisfactory results, Sheikh Mujibur Rahman called for a nationwide strike. Bhutto feared a civil war, therefore, he sent his trusted companion, Mubashir Hassan. A message was conveyed, and Rahman decided to meet Bhutto. Upon his arrival, Rahman met with Bhutto and both agreed to form a coalition government with Rahman as premier and Bhutto as president; however, Sheikh Mujib later ruled out such possibility. Meanwhile, the military was unaware of these developments, and Bhutto increased his pressure on Rahman to reach a decision.

On 7 March 1971, Sheikh Mujibur Rahman (soon to be the prime minister) delivered a speech at the Racecourse Ground (now called the Suhrawardy Udyan). In this speech he mentioned a further four-point condition to consider at the National Assembly Meeting on 25 March:
 The immediate lifting of martial law.
 Immediate withdrawal of all military personnel to their barracks.
 An inquiry into the loss of life.
 Immediate transfer of power to the elected representative of the people before the assembly meeting 25 March.

He urged his people to turn every house into a fort of resistance. He closed his speech saying, "Our struggle is for our freedom. Our struggle is for our independence." This speech is considered the main event that inspired the nation to fight for its independence. General Tikka Khan was flown into Dacca to become Governor of East Bengal. East-Pakistani judges, including Justice Siddique, refused to swear him in.

Between 10 and 13 March, Pakistan International Airlines cancelled all their international routes to urgently fly "government passengers" to Dacca. These "government passengers" were almost all Pakistani soldiers in civilian dress. MV Swat, a ship of the Pakistan Navy carrying ammunition and soldiers, was harboured in Chittagong Port, but the Bengali workers and sailors at the port refused to unload the ship. A unit of East Pakistan Rifles refused to obey commands to fire on the Bengali demonstrators, beginning a mutiny among the Bengali soldiers.

Response to the 1970 cyclone 

The 1970 Bhola cyclone made landfall on the East Pakistan coastline during the evening of 12 November, around the same time as a local high tide, killing an estimated 300,000 people. A 2017 World Meteorological Organization panel considers it the deadliest tropical cyclone since at least 1873. A week after the landfall, President Khan conceded that his government had made "slips" and "mistakes" in its handling of the relief efforts due to a lack of understanding of the magnitude of the disaster.

A statement released by eleven political leaders in East Pakistan ten days after the cyclone hit charged the government with "gross neglect, callous and utter indifference". They also accused the president of playing down the magnitude of the problem in news coverage. On 19 November, students held a march in Dacca protesting the slowness of the government's response. Abdul Hamid Khan Bhashani addressed a rally of 50,000 people on 24 November, where he accused the president of inefficiency and demanded his resignation.

As the conflict between East and West Pakistan developed in March, the Dacca offices of the two government organisations directly involved in relief efforts were closed for at least two weeks, first by a general strike and then by a ban on government work in East Pakistan by the Awami League. With this increase in tension, foreign personnel were evacuated over fears of violence. Relief work continued in the field, but long-term planning was curtailed. This conflict widened into the Bangladesh Liberation War in December and concluded with the creation of Bangladesh. This was one of the first times that a natural event helped trigger a civil war.

Operation Searchlight 

A planned military pacification carried out by the Pakistan Army—codenamed Operation Searchlight—started on 25 March 1971 to curb the Bengali independence movement by taking control of the major cities on 26 March, and then eliminating all opposition, political or military, within one month. The Pakistani state used anti-Bihari violence by Bengalis in early March to justify launching Operation Searchlight.

Before the beginning of the operation, all foreign journalists were systematically deported from East Pakistan.

The main phase of Operation Searchlight ended with the fall of the last major town in Bengali hands in mid-May. The operation also began the 1971 Bangladesh genocide. These systematic killings served only to enrage the Bengalis, which ultimately resulted in the secession of East Pakistan later in the same year. Bangladeshi media and reference books in English have published casualty figures which vary greatly, from 5,000 to 35,000 in Dacca, and 200,000 to 3,000,000 for Bangladesh as a whole, although independent researchers, including the British Medical Journal, have put forward the figure ranging from between 125,000 and 505,000. American political scientist Rudolph Rummel puts total deaths at 1.5 million. The atrocities have been referred to as acts of genocide.

According to the Asia Times,

Although the violence focused on the provincial capital, Dacca, it also affected all parts of East Pakistan. Residential halls of the University of Dacca were particularly targeted. The only Hindu residential hall—Jagannath Hall—was destroyed by the Pakistani armed forces, and an estimated 600 to 700 of its residents were murdered. The Pakistani army denied any cold blooded killings at the university, though the Hamoodur Rahman Commission in Pakistan concluded that overwhelming force was used at the university. This fact, and the massacre at Jagannath Hall and nearby student dormitories of Dacca University, are corroborated by a videotape secretly filmed by Professor Nurul Ula of the East Pakistan University of Engineering and Technology, whose residence was directly opposite the student dormitories.

The scale of the atrocities was first made clear in the West when Anthony Mascarenhas, a Pakistani journalist who had been sent to the province by the military authorities to write a story favourable to Pakistan's actions, instead fled to the United Kingdom and, on 13 June 1971, published an article in The Sunday Times describing the systematic killings by the military. The BBC wrote: "There is little doubt that Mascarenhas' reportage played its part in ending the war. It helped turn world opinion against Pakistan and encouraged India to play a decisive role", with Indian Prime Minister Indira Gandhi herself stating that Mascarenhas' article has led her "to prepare the ground for India's armed intervention".

Sheikh Mujibur Rahman was arrested by the Pakistani Army. Yahya Khan appointed Brigadier (later General) Rahimuddin Khan to preside over a special tribunal prosecuting Rahman with multiple charges. The tribunal's sentence was never made public, but Yahya caused the verdict to be held in abeyance in any case. Other Awami League leaders were arrested as well, while a few fled Dacca to avoid arrest. The Awami League was banned by General Yahya Khan.

Declaration of independence 

The violence unleashed by the Pakistani forces on 25 March 1971 proved the last straw to the efforts to negotiate a settlement. Following these incidents, Sheikh Mujibur Rahman signed an official declaration that read:

Sheikh Mujib also called upon the people to resist the occupation forces through a radio message. Rahman was arrested on the night of 25–26 March 1971 at about 1:30 am (as per Radio Pakistan's news on 29 March 1971).

A telegram containing the text of Sheikh Mujibur Rahman's declaration reached some students in Chittagong. The message was translated to Bengali by Dr. Manjula Anwar. The students failed to secure permission from higher authorities to broadcast the message from the nearby Agrabad Station of Pakistan Broadcasting Corporation. However, the message was read several times by the independent Swadhin Bangla Betar Kendro Radio established by some rebel Bangali Radio workers in Kalurghat. Major Ziaur Rahman was requested to provide security of the station and he also read the Declaration on 27 March 1971. Major Ziaur Rahman broadcast announcement of the declaration of independence on behalf of Sheikh Mujibur Rahman.

The Kalurghat Radio Station's transmission capability was limited, but the message was picked up by a Japanese ship in the Bay of Bengal. It was then re-transmitted by Radio Australia and later by the BBC.

M. A. Hannan, an Awami League leader from Chittagong, is said to have made the first announcement of the declaration of independence over the radio on 26 March 1971.

26 March 1971 is considered the official Independence Day of Bangladesh, and the name Bangladesh was in effect henceforth. In July 1971, Indian Prime Minister Indira Gandhi openly referred to the former East Pakistan as Bangladesh. Some Pakistani and Indian officials continued to use the name "East Pakistan" until 16 December 1971.

Liberation war

March–June 
At first, resistance was spontaneous and disorganised, and was not expected to be prolonged. However, when the Pakistani Army cracked down upon the population, resistance grew. The Mukti Bahini became increasingly active. The Pakistani military sought to quell them, but increasing numbers of Bengali soldiers defected to this underground "Bangladesh army". These Bengali units slowly merged into the Mukti Bahini and bolstered their weaponry with supplies from India. Pakistan responded by airlifting in two infantry divisions and reorganising their forces. They also raised paramilitary forces of Razakars, Al-Badrs and Al-Shams (who were mostly members of the Muslim League and other Islamist groups), as well as other Bengalis who opposed independence, and Bihari Muslims who had settled during the time of partition.

On 17 April 1971, a provisional government was formed in Meherpur District in western Bangladesh bordering India with Sheikh Mujibur Rahman, who was in prison in Pakistan, as president, Syed Nazrul Islam as acting president, Tajuddin Ahmad as prime minister, and General Muhammad Ataul Ghani Osmani as Commander-in-Chief, Bangladesh Forces. As fighting grew between the occupation army and the Bengali Mukti Bahini, an estimated 10 million Bengalis sought refuge in the Indian states of Assam and West Bengal.

June–September 

Bangladesh forces command was set up on 11 July, with Col. M. A. G. Osmani as commander-in-chief (C-in-C) with the status of Cabinet Minister, Lt. Col., Abdur Rabb as chief of Staff (COS), Group Captain A K Khandker as Deputy Chief of Staff (DCOS) and Major A R Chowdhury as Assistant Chief of Staff (ACOS).

General Osmani had differences of opinion with the Indian leadership regarding the role of the Mukti Bahini in the conflict. Indian leadership initially envisioned a well trained force of 8,000 guerrillas, operating in small cells around Bangladesh to facilitate eventual conventional combat. With the Bangladesh government in exile, General Osmani favoured a different strategy:
 Bengali conventional forces would occupy lodgments inside Bangladesh and then the Bangladesh government would request international diplomatic recognition and intervention. Initially Mymensingh was picked for this operation, but Gen. Osmani later settled on Sylhet.
 Sending the maximum number of guerrillas into Bangladesh as soon as possible with the following objectives:
 Increasing Pakistani casualties through raids and ambush.
 Cripple economic activity by hitting power stations, railway lines, storage depots and communication networks.
 Destroy Pakistan army mobility by blowing up bridges/culverts, fuel depots, trains and river crafts.
 The strategic objective was to make the Pakistanis spread their forces inside the province, so attacks could be made on isolated Pakistani detachments.

Bangladesh was divided into eleven sectors in July, each with a commander chosen from defected officers of the Pakistani army who joined the Mukti Bahini to lead guerrilla operations. The Mukti Bahini forces were given two to five weeks of training by the Indian army on guerilla warfare. Most of their training camps were situated near the border area and were operated with assistance from India. The 10th Sector was directly placed under the Commander in Chief (C-in-C) General M. A. G. Osmani and included the Naval Commandos and C-in-C's special force. Three brigades (11 Battalions) were raised for conventional warfare; a large guerrilla force (estimated at 100,000) was trained.

Five infantry battalions were reformed and positioned along the northern and eastern borders of Bangladesh. Three more battalions were raised, and artillery batteries were formed. During June and July, Mukti Bahini had regrouped across the border with Indian aid through Operation Jackpot and began sending 2000–5000 guerrillas across the border, the so-called Monsoon Offensive, which for various reasons (lack of proper training, supply shortage, lack of a proper support network inside Bangladesh) failed to achieve its objectives. Bengali regular forces also attacked border outposts in Mymensingh, Comilla and Sylhet, but the results were mixed. Pakistani authorities concluded that they had successfully contained the Monsoon Offensive, which proved a near-accurate observation.

Guerrilla operations, which slackened during the training phase, picked up after August. Economic and military targets in Dacca were attacked. The major success story was Operation Jackpot, in which naval commandos mined and blew up berthed ships in Chittagong, Mongla, Narayanganj and Chandpur on 15 August 1971.

October–December 

Bangladeshi conventional forces attacked border outposts. Kamalpur, Belonia and the Battle of Boyra are a few examples. 90 out of 370 border outposts fell to Bengali forces. Guerrilla attacks intensified, as did Pakistani and Razakar reprisals on civilian populations. Pakistani forces were reinforced by eight battalions from West Pakistan. The Bangladeshi independence fighters even managed to temporarily capture airstrips at Lalmonirhat and Shalutikar. Both of these were used for flying in supplies and arms from India. Pakistan sent another five battalions from West Pakistan as reinforcements.

Indian involvement 

Indian Prime Minister Indira Gandhi had concluded that instead of taking in millions of refugees, India would be economically better off going to war against Pakistan. As early as 28 April 1971, the Indian Cabinet had asked General Manekshaw (Chairman of the Chiefs of Staff Committee) to "Go into East Pakistan". Hostile relations in the past between India and Pakistan added to India's decision to intervene in Pakistan's civil war.

As a result, the Indian government decided to support the creation of a separate state for ethnic Bengalis by supporting the Mukti Bahini. RAW helped to organise, train and arm these insurgents. Consequently, the Mukti Bahini succeeded in harassing Pakistani military in East Pakistan, thus creating conditions conducive for a full-scale Indian military intervention in early December.

The Pakistan Air Force (PAF) launched a pre-emptive strike on Indian Air Force bases on 3 December 1971. The attack was modelled on the Israeli Air Force's Operation Focus during the Six-Day War, and intended to neutralise the Indian Air Force planes on the ground. The strike was seen by India as an open act of unprovoked aggression, which marked the official start of the Indo-Pakistani War. As a response to the attack, both India and Pakistan formally acknowledged the "existence of a state of war between the two countries" even though neither government had formally issued a declaration of war.

Three Indian corps were involved in the liberation of East Pakistan. They were supported by nearly three brigades of Mukti Bahini fighting alongside them, and many more who were fighting irregularly. That was far superior to the Pakistani army of three divisions. The Indians quickly overran the country, selectively engaging or bypassing heavily defended strongholds. Pakistani forces were unable to effectively counter the Indian attack, as they had been deployed in small units around the border to counter the guerrilla attacks by the Mukti Bahini. Unable to defend Dacca, the Pakistanis surrendered on 16 December 1971.

Air and naval war 
The Indian Air Force carried out several sorties against Pakistan, and within a week, IAF aircraft dominated the skies of East Pakistan. It achieved near-total air supremacy by the end of the first week, as the entire Pakistani air contingent in the east, PAF No.14 Squadron, was grounded because of Indian and Bangladesh airstrikes at Tejgaon, Kurmitolla, Lalmonirhat and Shamsher Nagar. Sea Hawks from the carrier  also struck Chittagong, Barisal and Cox's Bazar, destroying the eastern wing of the Pakistan Navy and effectively blockading the East Pakistan ports, thereby cutting off any escape routes for the stranded Pakistani soldiers. The nascent Bangladesh Navy (comprising officers and sailors who defected from the Pakistani Navy) aided the Indians in the marine warfare, carrying out attacks, most notably Operation Jackpot.

Surrender and aftermath 

On 16 December 1971, Lt. Gen Amir Abdullah Khan Niazi, Chief Martial Law Administrator of East Pakistan and Commander of Pakistan Army forces located in East Pakistan signed the Instrument of Surrender. At the time of surrender only a few countries had provided diplomatic recognition to the new nation. Over 93,000 Pakistani troops surrendered to the Indian forces and Bangladesh Liberation forces, making it the largest surrender since World War II.

Bangladesh sought admission to the UN with most voting in its favour. China vetoed this as Pakistan was its key ally. The United States, also a key ally of Pakistan, was one of the last nations to accord Bangladesh recognition. To ensure a smooth transition, in 1972 the Simla Agreement was signed between India and Pakistan. The treaty ensured that Pakistan recognised the independence of Bangladesh in exchange for the return of the Pakistani PoWs.

India treated all the PoWs in strict accordance with the Geneva Convention, rule 1925. It released more than 93,000 Pakistani PoWs in five months. Further, as a gesture of goodwill, nearly 200 soldiers who were sought for war crimes by Bengalis were also pardoned by India. The accord also gave back  of land that Indian troops had seized in West Pakistan during the war, though India retained a few strategic areas; most notably Kargil (which would in turn again be the focal point for a war between the two nations in 1999). This was done as a measure of promoting "lasting peace" and was acknowledged by many observers as a sign of maturity by India. However, some in India felt that the treaty had been too lenient to Bhutto, who had pleaded for leniency, arguing that the fragile democracy in Pakistan would crumble if the accord was perceived as being overly harsh by Pakistanis.

Reaction in West Pakistan to the war 
Reaction to the defeat and dismemberment of half the nation was a shocking loss to top military and civilians alike. Few had expected that they would lose the formal war in under a fortnight, and there was also unsettlement over what was perceived as a meek surrender of the army in East Pakistan. Yahya Khan's dictatorship collapsed and gave way to Bhutto, who took the opportunity to rise to power.

General Niazi, who surrendered along with 93,000 troops, was viewed with suspicion and contempt upon his return to Pakistan. He was shunned and branded a traitor. The war also exposed the shortcomings of Pakistan's declared strategic doctrine that the "defence of East Pakistan lay in West Pakistan".

Atrocities 

During the war there were widespread killings and other atrocities—including the displacement of civilians in Bangladesh (East Pakistan at the time) and widespread violations of human rights began with the start of Operation Searchlight on 25 March 1971. Members of the Pakistani military and supporting paramilitary forces killed an estimated 300,000 to 3,000,000 people and raped between 200,000 and 400,000 Bangladeshi women in a systematic campaign of genocidal rape. Pakistan's religious leaders openly supported the crime by labelling Bengali freedom fighters as "Hindus" and Bengali women as "the booty of war". But in reality, more than 80 percent of the Bengali people were Muslims at that time.

A large section of the intellectual community of Bangladesh were murdered, mostly by the Al-Shams and Al-Badr forces, at the instruction of the Pakistani Army. Just two days before the surrender, on 14 December 1971, Pakistan Army and Razakar militia (local collaborators) picked up at least 100 physicians, professors, writers and engineers in Dacca, and murdered them, leaving the dead bodies in a mass grave.

Many mass graves have been discovered in Bangladesh. The first night of war on Bengalis, which is documented in telegrams from the American Consulate in Dacca to the United States State Department, saw indiscriminate killings of students of Dacca University and other civilians. Numerous women were tortured, raped and killed during the war; the exact numbers are not known and are a subject of debate. The widespread rape of Bangladeshi women led to birth of thousands of war babies.

The Pakistan Army also kept numerous Bengali women as sex-slaves inside the Dacca Cantonment. Most of the girls were captured from Dacca University and private homes. There was significant sectarian violence not only perpetrated and encouraged by the Pakistani army, but also by Bengali nationalists against non-Bengali minorities, especially Biharis. In June 1971, Bihari representatives stated that 500,000 Biharis were killed by Bengalis. R. J. Rummel gives a prudent estimate of 150,000 killed.

On 16 December 2002, the George Washington University's National Security Archive published a collection of declassified documents, consisting mostly of communications between US embassy officials and United States Information Service centres in Dacca and India, and officials in Washington, D.C. These documents show that US officials working in diplomatic institutions within Bangladesh used the terms "selective genocide" and "genocide" (see The Blood Telegram) for information on events they had knowledge of at the time. Genocide is the term that is still used to describe the event in almost every major publication and newspaper in Bangladesh, although in Pakistan, the accusations against Pakistani forces continue to be disputed.

International reactions 

Following Sheikh Mujibur Rahman's declaration of independence in March 1971, a worldwide campaign was undertaken by the Provisional Government of Bangladesh to drum up political support for the independence of East Pakistan as well as humanitarian support for the Bengali people.

Indian Prime Minister Indira Gandhi provided extensive diplomatic and political support to the Bangladesh movement. She toured many countries in a bid to create awareness of the Pakistani atrocities against Bengalis. This effort was to prove vital later during the war, in framing the world's context of the war and to justify military action by India. Also, following Pakistan's defeat, it ensured prompt recognition of the newly independent state of Bangladesh.

United Nations 

Though the United Nations condemned the human rights violations during and following Operation Searchlight, it failed to defuse the situation politically before the start of the war.

Following India's entry into the war, Pakistan, fearing certain defeat, made urgent appeals to the United Nations to intervene and force India to agree to a ceasefire. The UN Security Council assembled on 4 December 1971 to discuss the hostilities in South Asia. After lengthy discussions on 7 December, the United States made a resolution for "immediate cease-fire and withdrawal of troops". While supported by the majority, the USSR vetoed the resolution twice. In light of the Pakistani atrocities against Bengalis, the United Kingdom and France abstained on the resolution.

On 12 December, with Pakistan facing imminent defeat, the United States requested that the Security Council be reconvened. Pakistan's Deputy Prime Minister and Foreign Minister, Zulfikar Ali Bhutto, was rushed to New York City to make the case for a resolution on the cease fire. The council continued deliberations for four days. By the time proposals were finalised, Pakistan's forces in the East had surrendered and the war had ended, making the measures merely academic. Bhutto, frustrated by the failure of the resolution and the inaction of the United Nations, ripped up his speech and left the council.

Most UN member nations were quick to recognise Bangladesh within months of its independence.

Bhutan
As the Bangladesh Liberation War approached the defeat of the Pakistan Army, the Himalayan kingdom of Bhutan became the first state in the world to recognise the newly independent country on 6 December 1971. Sheikh Mujibur Rahman, the first President of Bangladesh visited Bhutan to attend the coronation of Jigme Singye Wangchuck, the fourth King of Bhutan in June 1974.

US and USSR 

The US government stood by its old ally Pakistan in terms of diplomacy and military threats. US President Richard Nixon and his National Security Advisor Henry Kissinger feared Soviet expansion into South and Southeast Asia. Pakistan was a close ally of the People's Republic of China, with whom Nixon had been negotiating a rapprochement and which he intended to visit in February 1972. Nixon feared that an Indian invasion of West Pakistan would mean total Soviet domination of the region, and that it would seriously undermine the global position of the United States and the regional position of America's new tacit ally, China.

To demonstrate to China the bona fides of the United States as an ally, and in direct violation of the US Congress-imposed sanctions on Pakistan, Nixon sent military supplies to Pakistan and routed them through Jordan and Iran, while also encouraging China to increase its arms supplies to Pakistan. The Nixon administration also ignored reports it received of the genocidal activities of the Pakistani Army in East Pakistan, most notably the Blood telegram.

Nixon denied getting involved in the situation, saying that it was an internal matter of Pakistan, but when Pakistan's defeat seemed certain, Nixon sent the aircraft carrier USS Enterprise to the Bay of Bengal, a move deemed by the Indians as a nuclear threat. Enterprise arrived on station on 11 December 1971. On 6 and 13 December, the Soviet Navy dispatched two groups of ships, armed with nuclear missiles, from Vladivostok; they trailed US Task Force 74 in the Indian Ocean from 18 December until 7 January 1972.

The Soviet Union supported Bangladesh and Indian armies, as well as the Mukti Bahini during the war, recognising that the independence of Bangladesh would weaken the position of its rivals—the United States and the People's Republic of China. It gave assurances to India that if a confrontation with the United States or China developed, the USSR would take countermeasures. This was enshrined in the Indo-Soviet friendship treaty signed in August 1971. The Soviets also sent a nuclear submarine to ward off the threat posed by USS Enterprise in the Indian Ocean.

At the end of the war, the Warsaw Pact countries were among the first to recognise Bangladesh. The Soviet Union accorded recognition to Bangladesh on 25 January 1972. The United States delayed recognition for some months, before according it on 8 April 1972.

China 
As a long-standing ally of Pakistan, the People's Republic of China reacted with alarm to the evolving situation in East Pakistan and the prospect of India invading West Pakistan and Pakistani-controlled Kashmir. On 10 December 1971, US President Nixon instructed Henry Kissinger to ask the Chinese to move some forces toward the frontier with India. Nixon said, "Threaten to move forces or move them, Henry, that's what they must do now." Kissinger met with Huang Hua, China's Permanent Representative to the United Nations, later that evening.

The Chinese did not, however, respond to this encouragement, because unlike the 1962 Sino-Indian War when India was caught entirely unaware, this time the Indian Army was prepared and had deployed eight mountain divisions to the Sino-Indian border to guard against such an eventuality. China instead threw its weight behind demands for an immediate ceasefire.

When Bangladesh applied for membership to the United Nations in 1972, China vetoed their application because two United Nations resolutions regarding the repatriation of Pakistani prisoners of war and civilians had not yet been implemented. China was also among the last countries to recognise independent Bangladesh, refusing to do so until 31 August 1975.

Sri Lanka 
Sri Lanka (then called Ceylon) saw the partition of Pakistan as an example for themselves and feared India might use its enhanced power against them in the future. Despite the left wing government of Sirimavo Bandaranaike following a neutral non-aligned foreign policy, Sri Lanka decided to help Pakistan in the war. As Pakistani aircraft could not fly over Indian territory, they would have to take a longer route around India and so they stopped at Bandaranaike Airport in Sri Lanka where they were refuelled before flying to East Pakistan.

Arab world 
As many Arab countries were allied with both the United States and Pakistan, it was easy for Kissinger to encourage them to participate. He sent letters to both, the King of Jordan and the King of Saudi Arabia. President Nixon gave permission for Jordan to send ten F-104s and promised to provide replacements. According to author Martin Bowman, "Libyan F-5s were reportedly deployed to Sargodha AFB, perhaps as a potential training unit to prepare Pakistani pilots for an influx of more F-5s from Saudi Arabia."

Libyan dictator Gaddafi also personally directed a strongly worded letter to Indian Prime Minister Indira Gandhi accusing her of aggression against Pakistan, which endeared him to all Pakistanis. In addition to these three countries, an unidentified Middle Eastern ally also supplied Pakistan with Mirage IIIs. However, other countries such as Syria and Tunisia were against interfering describing it as an internal matter of Pakistan.

In popular culture

See also 

 Bangladesh Liberation War and Islam
 Awards and decorations of the Bangladesh Liberation War
 Liberation War Museum
 Movement demanding trial of war criminals (Bangladesh)
 NAP-Communist Party-Students Union Special Guerrilla Forces

Notes

References

Sources

Further reading 

 Ayoob, Mohammed and Subrahmanyam, K., The Liberation War, S. Chand and Co. pvt Ltd. New Delhi, 1972.
 Bass, Gary J. The Blood Telegram: Nixon, Kissinger, and a Forgotten Genocide. Vintage, 2014. 
 Bhargava, G.S., Crush India or Pakistan's Death Wish, ISSD, New Delhi, 1972.
 Bhattacharyya, S. K., Genocide in East Pakistan/Bangladesh: A Horror Story, A. Ghosh Publishers, 1988.
 Blood, A. K. (2005). The cruel birth of Bangladesh: Memoirs of an American diplomat. Dhaka: University Press.
 Brownmiller, Susan: Against Our Will: Men, Women, and Rape, Ballantine Books, 1993.
 
 
 Govt. of Bangladesh, Documents of the war of Independence, Vol 01–16, Ministry of Information.
 Hitchens, Christopher, The Trials of Henry Kissinger, Verso (2001). 
 Kanjilal, Kalidas, The Perishing Humanity, Sahitya Loke, Calcutta, 1976
 Johnson, Rob, 'A Region in Turmoil' (New York and London, 2005)
 Malik, Amita, The Year of the Vulture, Orient Longmans, New Delhi, 1972.
 Matinuddin, General Kamal, Tragedy of Errors: East Pakistan Crisis, 1968–1971, Wajidalis, Lahore, Pakistan, 1994.
 Mookherjee, Nayanika, A Lot of History: Sexual Violence, Public Memories and the Bangladesh Liberation War of 1971, D.Phil. thesis in Social Anthropology, SOAS, University of London, 2002.
 National Security Archive, The Tilt: the U.S. and the South Asian Crisis of 1971 
 Quereshi, Major General Hakeem Arshad, The 1971 Indo-Pak War, A Soldiers Narrative, Oxford University Press, 2002.
 Raghavan, Srinath, 1971: A Global History of the Creation of Bangladesh, Harvard Univ. Press, 2013.
 Rummel, R. J., Death By Government, Transaction Publishers, 1997.
 Sisson, Richard & Rose, Leo, War and secession: Pakistan, India, and the creation of Bangladesh, University of California Press (Berkeley), 1990.
 Stephen, Pierre, and Payne, Robert, Massacre, Macmillan, New York, (1973). 
 Totten, Samuel et al., eds., Century of Genocide: Eyewitness Accounts and Critical Views, Garland Reference Library, 1997
 US Department of State Office of the Historian, Foreign Relations of the United States, 1969–1976, Volume XI, South Asia Crisis, 1971 
 Zaheer, Hasan: The separation of East Pakistan: The rise and realisation of Bengali Muslim nationalism, Oxford University Press, 1994.

External links

 
 1971 Bangladesh Genocide Archive
 Freedom In the Air, The Daily Star
 Eyewitness Accounts: Genocide in Bangladesh
 The women of 1971. Tales of abuse and rape by the Pakistan Army
 1971 Massacre in Bangladesh and the Fallacy in the Hamoodur Rahman Commission Report, Dr. M.A. Hasan
 Women of Pakistan Apologize for War Crimes, 1996
 Sheikh Mujib wanted a confederation: US papers, by Anwar Iqbal, Dawn, 7 July 2005
 Page containing copies of the surrender documents
 Bangladesh Liberation War Picture Gallery Graphic images, viewer discretion advised
 Rashid Askari:Liberation War facts
 1971 War: How Russia sank Nixon's gunboat diplomacy
 PM reiterated her vow to declare March 25 as Genocide Day
 Call for international recognition and observance of genocide day
 Genocide Day: As it was in March 1971
 The case for UN recognition of Bangladesh genocide

 
Separatism in Pakistan
Civil wars involving the states and peoples of Asia
Civil wars post-1945
War crimes in Bangladesh
Wars involving Bangladesh
Military history of Bangladesh
Wars involving Pakistan
War